The Ring of Steel (Kamerband-i Shahr-i Kabul, "Belt of the City of Kabul")  was a series of 25 Afghan National Police checkpoints in the city of Kabul. Set up in June 2010, the Ring of Steel was designed for security purposes and manned, who occasionally stop and check suspicious vehicles attempting to pass through.

References

Kabul
Law enforcement in Afghanistan